Michael E. Martin is a United States Air Force Major General who serves as the Commanding General of Special Operations Command Korea since June 23, 2021. He previously served as the Director of Operations of the Air Force Special Operations Command and prior to that was the Deputy Commanding General of the NATO Special Operations Component Command-Afghanistan.

References

Living people
Place of birth missing (living people)
Recipients of the Defense Superior Service Medal
Recipients of the Legion of Merit
United States Air Force generals
United States Air Force personnel of the Iraq War
United States Air Force personnel of the War in Afghanistan (2001–2021)
Year of birth missing (living people)